Sofoklis Schortsanitis (Greek: Σοφοκλής Σχορτσανίτης; born 22 June 1985) is a Greek former professional basketball player and Olympian.

An All-EuroLeague First Team selection in 2011, Schortsanitis won the EuroLeague title in 2014 with Maccabi Tel Aviv, and reached the EuroLeague Final in 2010 and 2011, while playing for Olympiacos and Maccabi, respectively. He was a member of the Greece men's national basketball team that captured silver medal honours in the 2006 FIBA World Championship and a bronze medal in the EuroBasket 2009. He is nicknamed "Big Sofo" or "Baby Shaq".

Early years
Born in his native port town of Tiko, Cameroon, Schortsanitis moved to his father's native country of Greece with his mother when he was very young. He has a younger brother called Alexandros. Schortsanitis first took up basketball in his home city of Kavala. It was there where his parents advised him to play basketball, and Schortsanitis at first did not like the sport. But eventually the game grew on him, he was always practicing. Eventually, a scout/coach discovered his talent, and pushed him into the sport.

Professional career
Schortsanitis began playing professional basketball with Iraklis in the 2000–01 Greek League season. Starting in the 2002–03 Greek League season when he was 17, he averaged 11.5 points and 6.2 rebounds per league game. His performance record would be a failure in Cantù's 2003–04 season, in the Italian League; he lacked maturity and experience. He would return to Greece to play in the 2004–05 season with the Greek club Aris.

Olympiacos
In the 2005–06 season, Schortsanitis was transferred to Olympiacos. He became a vital member of the team that reached the EuroLeague quarterfinals, and his performances impressed Panagiotis Giannakis, who picked him for the Greece men's national basketball team at the end of the season.

During the following two years, Schortsanitis failed to achieve consistency, and his chronic weight issues reemerged, to the point that he spent almost the entire 2007–08 season dealing with them. He came back in shape for the 2008–09 season, and helped Olympiacos reach the EuroLeague Final Four. In the 2009–10 season, he made another step towards consistency, displaying his most mature performances with Olympiacos, on the club's way to the EuroLeague Final, which they lost to Juan Carlos Navarro's and Ricky Rubio's Barcelona, 86–68.

Maccabi Tel Aviv
On 5 August 2010, Schortsanitis signed a two-year deal with the then five-time EuroLeague champions, Maccabi Tel Aviv of the Israeli Premier League. His presence alongside Jeremy Pargo, Chuck Eidson, and Doron Perkins helped the team reach the 2011 EuroLeague Final, where they eventually lost to Dimitris Diamantidis' Panathinaikos, by a score of 78–70. Schortsanitis averaged 12 points, 4.1 rebounds and 1 assist per game throughout the EuroLeague 2010–11 season, earning an All-EuroLeague First Team selection.

In the 2011–12 season, Schortsanitis fought a chronic knee injury, which affected his performance during the season, and left him unable to participate with the national team that summer. Nevertheless, he helped Maccabi reach the EuroLeague quarterfinals, where they were topped by Panathinaikos, losing the series, 3–2.

Panathinaikos
On 4 July 2012, Schortsanitis signed a three-year contract with the Greek club Panathinaikos, worth €1.5 million euros net income. He reportedly turned down significantly more lucrative offers from Baskonia Vitoria and Galatasaray, among others, to return to Greece and fulfill his desire to play for Panathinaikos. In July 2013, Panathinaikos announced that Schortsanitis would not continue play for the club.

Second stint with Maccabi
On 10 July 2013, Schortsanitis returned to Maccabi after one season in Panathinaikos, and signed a three-year contract with the defending Israeli Premier League champions. In his comeback season with Maccabi, the club won the finals of that season's EuroLeague, which was the first EuroLeague championship won in Schortsanitis' career. Over 29 games played in the EuroLeague that season, he averaged 9.6 points and 2.6 rebounds per game, in 14.2 minutes per game of playing time.

Crvena zvezda
On 2 August 2015, Schortsanitis signed a one-year contract with the Serbian club Crvena zvezda. On 28 October 2015, he parted ways with Zvezda. In 6 games played with the club in the ABA League's 2015–16 season, he averaged 4.8 points and 2.5 rebounds per game.

PAOK
On 2 November 2015, Schortsanitis signed with the Greek club PAOK, for the rest of the season. With PAOK, he averaged 13.4 points, 4.4 rebounds, and 1.8 assists per game, in the European-wide 2nd-tier level EuroCup's 2015–16 season.

Apollon Patras
In December 2016, Schortsanitis joined the Greek club Apollon Patras. However, on 28 December, he suffered a serious injury, as he ruptured his Achilles tendon, during one of the team's practices. The injury caused him to then miss the entire remainder of the Greek Basket League 2016–17 season, and he was thus not able to play in any games with Apollon.

Aries Trikala
On 18 October 2017, Schortsanitis returned to action, and joined Aries Trikala of the Greek Basket League, for the 2017–18 season. On 6 January 2018, he made his debut in a 76–86 loss to Rethymno Cretan Kings, recording 6 points and one rebound, off the bench.

Ionikos Nikaias
On 24 July 2019, Schortsanitis signed with Ionikos Nikaias for the Greek Basket League 2019–20 season.

NBA draft rights
Schortsanitis drew interest from the NBA's Los Angeles Clippers in the summer of 2006, after having been originally selected in the 2nd round (34th overall) of the 2003 NBA Draft; however, because he was still under contract with Olympiacos at the time, he did not make a move to the NBA. In 2010, his contract with Olympiacos expired, and he elected to participate in the NBA Summer League with the Clippers, with an eye towards joining the team; this time, however, the Clippers were unimpressed, and he failed to secure a contract with the team. On 30 July 2012, the Los Angeles Clippers traded the draft rights of Schortsanitis, to the Atlanta Hawks, in a sign-and-trade deal for Willie Green.

On 15 July 2014, his draft rights were traded to the Oklahoma City Thunder, in exchange for Thabo Sefolosha, the rights to Georgios Printezis, and cash considerations.

Retirement
On 10 December 2020, Schortsanitis announced his retirement from playing pro club basketball. Thus, making him one of the eleven players from the 2003 NBA Draft Class to have never played in the NBA.

National team career

Greece "Under" national teams
Schortsanitis was on the squad of the Under-16 national team that played at the 2001 FIBA Europe Under-16 Championship, the squad of the Under-18 national team that won a bronze medal at the 2002 FIBA Europe Under-18 Championship, and 
the squad of the Under-19 national team that won a bronze medal at the 2003 FIBA Under-19 World Cup. Schortsanitis was on the squad of the junior national team that won the gold medal at the 2002 Albert Schweitzer Under-18 World Tournament, where he was also named the MVP of the tournament.

Greece national team
Play at friendly games and qualifiers were Schortsanitis' introduction to being on the senior Greek national team, before making his first appearance at a major FIBA competition at the 2006 FIBA World Championship, which was held in Japan. He helped Greece to win the silver medal, after they defeated Team USA, by a score of 101–95, in the semifinals. Schortsanitis scored 14 points, in 17 minutes in the game. He also played with Greece at the 2008 Summer Olympics.

At the 2009 EuroBasket, which was held in Poland, Schortsanitis' performance was decisive in Greece winning the tournament's bronze medal game against Slovenia, as he scored 23 points on a 78% field goal shooting percentage, while grabbing six rebounds, blocking two shots, and managing to draw 12 fouls. He also played at the 2010 FIBA World Championship.

Player profile
Schortsanitis is a classic, "old school" style center that plays in the low post on offence, and that defends the rim and painted lane area of the court on defense.

Career statistics

EuroLeague

|-
| style="text-align:left;"|2005–06
| style="text-align:left;"|Olympiacos
| 22 || 1 || 19.1 || .618 ||  || .632 || 4.9 || .5 || 1.2 || .6 || 10.7 || 12.0
|-
| style="text-align:left;"|2006–07
| style="text-align:left;"|Olympiacos
| 17 || 1 || 11.0 || .655 ||  || .507 || 1.8 || .7 || .4 || .4 || 6.6 || 5.4
|-
| style="text-align:left;"|2008–09
| style="text-align:left;"|Olympiacos
| 13 || 1 || 8.3 || .568 || .000 || .625 || 1.8 || .3 || .2 || .1 || 4.4 || 2.8
|-
| style="text-align:left;"|2009–10
| style="text-align:left;"|Olympiacos
| 19 || 18 || 13.3 || .614 ||  || .486 || 2.5 || .6 || .5 || .2 || 7.2 || 6.6
|-
| style="text-align:left;"|2010–11
| style="text-align:left;"|Maccabi
| 22 || 20 || 19.2 || .585 ||  || .625 || 4.1 || 1.0 || .8 || .6 || 12.0 || 13.0
|-
| style="text-align:left;"|2011–12
| style="text-align:left;"|Maccabi
| 21 || 14 || 16.0 || .595 ||  || .625 || 3.0 || 1.0 || .6 || .4 || 8.7 || 8.6
|-
| style="text-align:left;"|2012–13
| style="text-align:left;"|Panathinaikos
| 26 || 9 || 12.1 || .576 ||  || .604 || 2.3 || .9 || .3 || .1 || 7.8 || 6.4
|-
| style="text-align:left; background:#AFE6BA;"|2013–14
| style="text-align:left;"|Maccabi
| 29 || 20 || 14.2 || .613 ||  || .577 || 2.6 || 1.1 || .8 || .3 || 9.6 || 8.3
|-
| style="text-align:left;"|2014–15
| style="text-align:left;"|Maccabi
| 26 || 20 || 14.7 || .528 ||  || .549 || 2.3 || 1.0 || .3 || .4 || 6.7 || 5.9
|-
| style="text-align:left;"|2015–16
| style="text-align:left;"|Crvena zvezda
| 2 || 1 || 15.2 || .500 ||  || .500 || .5 || .0 || .0 || .5 || 4.5 || -1.5
|- class="sortbottom"
| style="text-align:center;" colspan="2"|Career
| 197 || 105 || 14.5 || .593 || .000 || .583 || 2.9 || .8 || .6 || .4 || 8.4 || 7.9

Awards and accomplishments

Professional career
 
 6× Greek League All-Star Game: (2005, 2006, 2007, 2010, 2013, 2020)
 2× Greek All-Star Game MVP: (2006, 2010)
 Greek League Best Five: (2006)
 2× Greek Cup Winner: (2010, 2013)
 4× Israeli State Cup Winner: (2011, 2012, 2014, 2015)
 EuroLeague Champion: (2014)
 All-EuroLeague First Team: (2011)
 3× Israeli Super League Champion: (2011, 2012, 2014)
 Adriatic League Champion: (2012)
 Greek League Champion: (2013)

Greek junior national team
 2001 FIBA Europe Under-16 Championship: All-First Team Selection
 2002 Albert Schweitzer Under-18 World Tournament: 
 2002 Albert Schweitzer Under-18 World Tournament: MVP
 2002 FIBA Europe Under-18 Championship: 
 2003 FIBA Under-19 World Cup:

Greek senior national team
 2006 FIBA World Championship: 
 2006 FIBA Stanković World Cup: 
 2009 EuroBasket: 
 2008 FIBA OQT: 
 Acropolis Tournament MVP: 2010

References

External links

 Sofoklis Schortsanitis at basket.gr 
 Sofoklis Schortsanitis at baskethotel.com
 Sofoklis Schortsanitis at draftexpress.com
 Sofoklis Schortsanitis at eurobasket.com
 Sofoklis Schortsanitis at euroleague.net
 
 Sofoklis Schortsanitis at fiba.com
 Sofoklis Schortsanitis at fibaeurope.com
 Sofoklis Schortsanitis at legabasket.it 

1985 births
Living people
2006 FIBA World Championship players
2010 FIBA World Championship players
ABA League players
Aries Trikala B.C. players
Aris B.C. players
Basketball players at the 2008 Summer Olympics
Basketball players from Kavala
Cameroonian expatriate basketball people in Serbia
Cameroonian expatriate sportspeople in Italy
Cameroonian men's basketball players
Cameroonian people of Greek descent
Centers (basketball)
Greek expatriate basketball people in Italy
Greek Basket League players
Greek expatriate basketball people in Serbia
Greek men's basketball players
Greek people of Cameroonian descent
Ionikos Nikaias B.C. players
Iraklis Thessaloniki B.C. players
Israeli Basketball Premier League players
KK Crvena zvezda players
Los Angeles Clippers draft picks
Maccabi Tel Aviv B.C. players
Olympiacos B.C. players
Olympic basketball players of Greece
Pallacanestro Cantù players
Panathinaikos B.C. players
P.A.O.K. BC players